Stubica may refer to:

 Stubica, Busovača, a village in Bosnia and Herzegovina
 Stubica, Ljubuški, a village in Bosnia and Herzegovina
 Donja Stubica, a town in Krapina-Zagorje County, Croatia
 Gornja Stubica, a municipality in Krapina-Zagorje County, Croatia
 Stubica, Primorje-Gorski Kotar County, a village near Vrbovsko, Croatia
 Stubica, Plužine, a village in Montenegro
 Stubica (Lazarevac), a village in Serbia
 Stubica (Paraćin), a village in Serbia

See also
 Hum Stubički (lit. "Hum of Stubica"), a town in the municipality of Gornja Stubica
 Stubičke Toplice (lit. "Stubica spa"), a spa town in Krapina-Zagorje County